Yanbei may refer to these places in China:

Yanbei, Jiangxi, a town in Yongfeng County, Jiangxi
Yanbei Subdistrict, Chaoyang City, Liaoning
Yanbei Subdistrict, Lanzhou, Gansu
Yanbei Subdistrict, Qihe County, Shandong
Yanbei Subdistrict, Yong'an, Fujian